Jean-Pierre Renevier (29 November 1928 – 23 June 2021) was a Swiss sailor. He competed in the Flying Dutchman event at the 1964 Summer Olympics.

References

External links
 

1928 births
2021 deaths
Swiss male sailors (sport)
Olympic sailors of Switzerland
Sailors at the 1964 Summer Olympics – Flying Dutchman
Place of birth missing